Graves is an American comedy television series, created by Joshua Michael Stern, that premiered on October 16, 2016, on Epix. The series stars Nick Nolte as the eponymous Richard Graves, a former President of the United States attempting to make amends for the mistakes he made in office. After two seasons, it was cancelled by Epix in 2017.

Premise
Graves begins when "twenty five years after his presidency, former President Richard Graves has the epiphany that his policies have damaged the country for decades and so, with his young assistant, he goes on a Don Quixote-like journey to right his administration’s wrongs just as his wife, the former First Lady, decides to follow her own political ambitions."

Cast and characters

Main

 Nick Nolte as Richard Graves
 Skylar Astin as Isaiah Miller
 Heléne Yorke as Olivia Graves

 Chris Lowell as Jeremy Graves
 Callie Hernandez as Samantha Vega
 Sela Ward as Margaret Graves

Recurring

 Roger Bart as Lawrence Mills
 Ernie Hudson as Jacob Mann
 Kathy Najimy as Isaiah's Mother

 Robert Pine as Senator Walsh
 Nora Dunn as Laura Wolf

Season 1
 Angelica Maria as Ramona Alvarez
 Nia Vardalos as Annie Spiro
 Tania Gunadi as Summer
 Khotan Fernandez as Arturo Del Rey
 Harry Hamlin as Johnathan Dalton
 Sale Taylor as Chuy
 Conor Leslie as Tasha Ludwig
 Chris Elliott as Thomas Nash

Season 2
 Spencer Grammer as Katie Farrell
 Joanna Sanchez as Julia Martinez
 Adam Goldberg as Christopher Sachs
 Wallace Shawn as Jerry North
 Lauren Weedman as Bonnie Clegg
 Michael Cyril Creighton as Phoenix Wells
 Sarah Baker as Becky Keegan
 Juliette Lewis as Bailey Todd

Guest
 Levi Lobo as Chaco ("Evil Good and Good Evil")
 Bob Balaban as Secretary Burns ("Nothing Can Come of Nothing")
 Alan Dale as Trevor Lloyd ("Lions in Winter")
 Matt Long as Jesse Enright ("The Opposite of People")
 Jacqueline Bisset as Diana Scott ("Something Left to Love")

Episodes

Season 1 (2016)

Season 2 (2017)

Production

Development
On February 26, 2015, it was reported that Epix was in negotiations to give the production a straight-to-series order for a first season consisting of ten episodes. The series was created by Joshua Michael Stern from a script he wrote on spec. Stern was also expected to serve as a director of the series and executive produce alongside Greg Shapiro. Production companies involved with the series were expected to include Lionsgate Television. On May 21, 2015, it was announced Epix had officially ordered the production to series. On June 11, 2015, it was announced that Keith Eisner and Eric Weinberg would serve as additional executive producers for the series. On July 30, 2016, it was announced that the series would premiere on October 16, 2016.

On November 17, 2016, it was announced that series had been renewed for a second season consisting of ten episodes. On July 25, 2017, it was reported that the second season would premiere on October 22, 2017. On December 21, 2017, it was announced that Epix had canceled the series.

Casting
Alongside the initial series order reporting, it was confirmed that Nick Nolte had been cast in the series' lead role. On July 8, 2015, it was announced that Susan Sarandon had been cast in a starring role. In September 2015, it was reported that Sarandon had withdrawn from her role citing creative differences. Additionally, it was announced that Skylar Astin, Chris Lowell, Angelica Maria, and Heléne Yorke had joined the cast of the series with Yorke in a series regular role. In October 2015, it was announced that Sela Ward had been cast to replace Sarandan, that Callie Hernandez had been cast in series regular role, and that Roger Bart, Ernie Hudson, Tania Gunadi, and Nia Vardalos would appear in a recurring capacity. On November 19, 2015, it was reported that Harry Hamlin had been cast in a recurring role.

In May 2017, it was announced that Adam Goldberg, Spencer Grammer, and Wallace Shawn would appear in season two in a recurring capacity. In June 2017, it was reported that Matt Long, Lauren Weedman, and Joanna Sanchez had joined the cast of season two in recurring roles. In July 2017, it was announced that Michael Cyril Creighton and Juliette Lewis had been cast in recurring for season two.

Reception

Critical response
The first season was met with a mixed to positive response from critics upon its premiere. On the review aggregation website Rotten Tomatoes, the series holds a 56% approval rating with an average rating of 5.41 out of 10 based on 9 reviews. Metacritic, which uses a weighted average, assigned the series a score of 61 out of 100 based on 10 critics, indicating "generally favorable reviews."

Awards and nominations

References

External links

2016 American television series debuts
2017 American television series endings
2010s American political comedy television series
English-language television shows
MGM+ original programming
Single-camera television sitcoms
Television series about dysfunctional families
Television series by Lionsgate Television
Television shows set in New Mexico
Television series about presidents of the United States